Anne Crawford was a British film actress.

Anne or Ann Crawford may also refer to:

People
Ann Street Barry (1734–1801), Mrs Crawford, British stage actress
Anne Crawford Flexner (1874–1955), American playwright
Anne Crawford-Lindsay (1631–1689), Duchess of Rothes

Fictional
Anne Crawford (Taken), a character in the TV series Taken
Ann Crawford, a character in the film What's Buzzin', Cousin? (played by Ann Miller)

See also